Ann Beach (7 June 1938 – 9 March 2017) was a British actress. She is perhaps best remembered for her supporting role as Sonia Barrett, the quirky next-door neighbour on the comedy Fresh Fields, starring Julia McKenzie and Anton Rodgers.

Career
She won a scholarship to RADA at the age of 16. After leaving, she went on tour with Frankie Howerd in Hotel Paradiso, and then came to London in the title role of Emlyn Williams's Beth. This was not a success, but she was soon busily engaged in television work, until she went back to the stage in the Theatre Workshop company at the Theatre Royal Stratford East. Among the parts she created there were Rosie in Fings Ain't Wot They Used T'Be (1960), and Miss Gilchrist in The Hostage. She then created the role of Barbara in Billy Liar at the Cambridge Theatre in September 1960.  She was also a member of the BBC's Radio Drama Company.

Personal life
She was married to Francis Coleman. She was the mother of Charlotte Coleman and Lisa Coleman.

Filmography

Film

Television

References

External links

https://web.archive.org/web/20081229142735/http://movie-tv-episode-database.com/cast-or-crew/Ann-Beach-38115/
NYTimes.com
 https://web.archive.org/web/20120404085820/http://movies.msn.com/celebrities/celebrity/ann-beach/
 https://web.archive.org/web/20070712125210/http://movies.yahoo.com/movie/contributor/1808925970
 http://www.tvguide.com/celebrities/ann-beach/credits/208582

1938 births
2017 deaths
Actors from Wolverhampton
English film actresses
English television actresses
20th-century English actresses
English stage actresses
Alumni of RADA
21st-century English actresses
20th-century British businesspeople